Benjamin L. Liebman (born 1969) is the Robert L. Lieff Professor of Law and the director of the Hong Yen Chang Center for Chinese Legal Studies at Columbia Law School. He is widely regarded as one of the world's pre-eminent scholars of contemporary Chinese law. 

He is the son of Lance Liebman, who is a professor at Columbia Law School and the former director of the American Law Institute, and of Carol B. Liebman, also a professor at Columbia Law School. He is the brother of Jeffrey B. Liebman, who was the executive associate director of the Office of Management and Budget within the administration of President Barack Obama.

On February 9, 2012, Liebman met with Vice President of the United States Joe Biden at the White House to discuss human rights in China. 

Liebman is affiliated with the Weatherhead East Asian Institute.

Education
Liebman received a Bachelor of Arts from Yale University in 1991, another Bachelor of Arts from the University of Oxford in 1993 and a Juris Doctor from Harvard Law School in 1998.

Positions
Robert L. Leiff Professor of Law and Director, Hong Yen Chang Center for Chinese Legal Studies, Columbia Law School, 2011-
Professor of Law and Director, Center for Chinese Legal Studies, Columbia Law School, 2007-2011
Associate Professor of Law and Director, Center for Chinese Legal Studies, Columbia Law School
Sullivan & Cromwell, London, 2000-2002
Law Clerk, Justice David H. Souter, Supreme Court of the United States, 1999-2000
Law Clerk, Judge Sandra Lynch, United States Court of Appeals, First Circuit, Boston, 1997-1998
Paul, Weiss, Rifkind, Wharton & Garrison, New York and Beijing, Summer 1997
Institute of Law, Chinese Academy of Social Sciences, Beijing, Summer 1996
Attorney, Coudert Brothers, Beijing, 1994-1995

See also 
 List of law clerks of the Supreme Court of the United States (Seat 3)

References

Columbia Law School faculty
Yale University alumni
Alumni of the University of Oxford
Harvard Law School alumni
1969 births
Living people
Law clerks of the Supreme Court of the United States

Weatherhead East Asian Institute faculty
Sullivan & Cromwell people